The 2010 ICC Americas Championship Division Four was a cricket tournament held in Mexico City, Mexico, which took place between 14 June and 16 June 2010. It gave three Affiliate members of the International Cricket Council from the Americas region experience of international one-day cricket and formed part of the global World Cricket League structure.  Following on from the 50 over tournament, the three teams played a Twenty20 tournament which ran from 17 June to 18 June 2010.

Teams
There were three teams participating in the tournament.  These teams are non-Test members of the ICC Americas region. The teams are:

Note: The tournament was set to have four teams, but Cuba "declined the invitation due to travel restrictions by their authorities," ICC Americas Development Manager, Martin Viera, advised CricInfo.

Group stage

Points Table

Fixtures

Twenty20 matches

References

International cricket competitions in 2010
2010, 4
International cricket competitions in Mexico